The Okurodani Dam is a rock-fill dam on the Oshirakawa River (a tributary of the Shō River) about  west of Shōkawa in Gifu Prefecture, Japan. It was constructed between 1969 and 1971.

See also

Miboro Dam – downstream on the Shō River

References

Dams in Gifu Prefecture
Rock-filled dams
Dams completed in 1971
Dams on the Shō River
Hydroelectric power stations in Japan
Energy infrastructure completed in 1971
Takayama, Gifu